Charles William Sproull (January 9, 1919 – January 13, 1980) was a Major League Baseball pitcher who played in  with the Philadelphia Phillies. He batted and threw right-handed.

Sproull was born in Taylorsville, Georgia, and died in Rockford, Illinois.

References

External links

1919 births
1980 deaths
Philadelphia Phillies players
Major League Baseball pitchers
Baseball players from Georgia (U.S. state)
Andalusia Bulldogs players
Jeanerette Blues players
Eau Claire Bears players
Madison Blues players
Macon Peaches players
Milwaukee Brewers (minor league) players
Houston Buffaloes players
Columbus Red Birds players
Atlanta Crackers players
Dallas Eagles players